Sergio Carnesalini (born 29 August 1982) is a retired Italian footballer .

Carnesalini had played over 110 games in both Serie C1 and Serie C2.

Biography
Born in Treviglio, the Province of Bergamo, Carnesalini started his career at Atalanta Bergamo. He spent a season with Alzano, and in mid-2002 sold to Aglianese in co-ownership deal. In mid-2004 he was signed by Serie C1 side Lucchese but missed the entire 2005–06 season. He then joined Lecco. Despite only played 14 games in regular season, he played all 4 promotion play-offs. He only played 7 games in 2007–08 Serie C1 and in January 2008 returned to Serie C2 side Viareggio. He followed the team promoted to Prima Divisione (ex- Serie C1) in 2009 despite losing the promotion play-offs and winning the relegation play-out in 2010.

On 3 July 2010 he signed a new 3-year contract, becoming one of the longest serving defenders along with Lorenzo Fiale. Despite a regular starter, he was swapped with Ravenna's Alessandro Visone on 10 January 2011, with Nicolò Brighenti replacing his starting place. That season he played once in the cup and a combined 31 games in the league, missed once in round 25 due to suspension. He also played in both legs of the relegation play-outs.

References

External links
 Football.it Profile 
 Ravenna Profile 
 FIGC 
 

Italian footballers
Atalanta B.C. players
Virtus Bergamo Alzano Seriate 1909 players
S.S.D. Lucchese 1905 players
Calcio Lecco 1912 players
F.C. Esperia Viareggio players
Ravenna F.C. players
Association football fullbacks
People from Treviglio
1982 births
Living people
Sportspeople from the Province of Bergamo
Footballers from Lombardy